Graytown is a former gold mining town in central Victoria, Australia.  Originally known as Spring Creek, Graytown was named after Moses Wilson Gray, who represented the electoral district of Rodney in the Victorian Legislative Assembly from 1860 to 1862.

Graytown is located just outside the northern edge of the Puckapunyal Military Area.

References

Towns in Victoria (Australia)
Shire of Strathbogie